Jack Preece is the name of:

Jack Preece (footballer)
Jack Preece (rugby union)